"En riktig jävla schlager" is a song written by Kjell Jennstig, Leif Goldkuhl and Henrik Dorsin, and performed by Ravaillacz during Melodifestivalen 2013, where the song ended up 10th.

The song charted at Svensktoppen for five weeks. before leaving the chart.

Charts

References 

2013 singles
Melodifestivalen songs of 2013
Swedish-language songs
Songs written by Kjell Jennstig
2013 songs